The Hyantiini are a tribe of cicadas from North and South America.

List of genera
 Hyantia Stål, 1866
 Mura Distant, 1905
 Quesada Distant, 1905

References

Cicadinae
Hemiptera tribes